The Vision of Escaflowne features an extensive cast of characters created by Sunrise and Shoji Kawamori.

Protagonists

Hitomi Kanzaki

 is the protagonist of The Vision of Escaflowne, appearing an ordinary school-girl with a crush on her track-team friend, Amano. She meets and saves the life of Van, a young prince from who crossed a portal from a different world in order to slay a dragon. Transported to Van's world, Gaea, she finds her fate is intertwined with his, even if her heart still belongs to Amano. She later meets Allen, a gallant knight who bears an uncanny resemblance to Amano, but realizes her true love is Van.

Lost in Gaia with no apparent way to return home, Hitomi finds that her hobby of tarot card reading is becoming frighteningly accurate, complete with visions of both the past and future that shed light on this alien, war-torn world.

Hitomi has a very realistic personality; she's shy, caring, forgiving and also has a temper. She is often afraid but pushes herself to do the right thing. Reserved yet prone to random displays of affection, she is for the most part honest, telling little white lies to benefit herself. She wants the best for others and at times, even herself as she seeks love and friendship. As a member of her school's track team, she is also a capable amateur athlete in long-distance running.

In the movie, Hitomi's portrayal is very different. This version of her is depressed and in a deep melancholy brought on by feelings of loneliness and the story shows her slowly overcoming this. She also does not show an interest in tarot card reading or have any psychic powers.

Van Fanel

 is the young half-Draconian King of Fanelia who must learn to cope with drastic changes in his life after Fanelia is destroyed by Zaibach. He pilots Escaflowne, a  Guymelef made by the mysterious Ispano tribe which can transform into a flying dragon. He earns his right to pilot Escaflowne through a blood pact which connects his body and soul to Escaflowne. Due to the blood pact and Hitomi's influence, Van becomes injured when the Escaflowne is damaged, and these wounds will not close until Escaflowne is repaired. Consequently, if Escaflowne is destroyed, Van will die.

His destiny and Hitomi's are linked, and he is initially dependent on Hitomi's clairvoyant abilities, which save his life more than once. He also holds a grudge against Folken for leaving his native Kingdom of Fanelia for Zaibach and Dornkirk for his grand ambitions. Due to being half-Draconian, Van is able to manifest a pair of feathered wings which enable him to fly. At first he treats Hitomi as a valued teammate, but falls in love with her as the series progress.

Allen Schezar

 is a member of the Knights Caeli, Asturia's elite knights who bears an uncanny resemblance to Hitomi's high school crush, Susumu Amano.

When Allen was younger, his younger sister Celena was kidnapped by Zaibach, his father disappeared mysteriously, and his mother died shortly afterwards. As a result of these events, Allen harbors a great deal of anger towards his father, Leon, for leaving his mother and family behind (it is later revealed that Leon truly loved Allen's mother and was murdered by Dornkirk's soldiers for the secrets of Atlantis). The Princess Millerna of Asturia as a massive crush on him, but he also demonstrates strong feelings for Hitomi as the series progresses.

Allen was a gifted swordsman at a young age, becoming one of the most skilled fighters of Gaea under the expert tutelage of Balgus of Fanelia. During his early knight career he and Princess Marlene fell in love and she bore his child, Chid. Later within the series, Allen briefly becomes romantically involved with Hitomi through Dornkirk's influence.

Antagonists

Folken Fanel

 the Strategos or tactician of Zaibach, Folken is revealed to be Van's older brother and the original heir to Fanelia. After he failed to kill a dragon, he lost an arm to the beast and was later picked up by the Zaibach, who nursed him back to health under Dornkirk's instructions and fitted him with a mechanical arm. He originally joined the empire in hopes of realizing Zaibach's ideals of a world free of war, but is later disillusioned and defects. He, like Van, is half Draconian and thus he also has angelic wings. His wings have turned black, however, a portent that his life is coming to an end. Folken dies when his sword breaks as he kills Dornkirk and strikes him in the heart.

In the Escaflowne movie, Folken is the movie's main antagonist and rewritten as the leader of Zaibach.

Dilandau Albatou

 is the leader of an elite group of Guymelef pilots called the Dragon Slayers in Dornkirk's army. Dilandau is a highly narcissistic, mentally unstable pyromaniac who abuses his soldiers, although he is also emotionally dependent on them as well (he gladly kills anyone who has caused any harm to them, such as the Doppelganger Zongi).

Towards the end of the series it is revealed that Dilandau, initially depicted as a male, is actually Allen's lost sister Celena, who was brainwashed and mutated by Zaibach's fate alteration machines. Dilandau eventually regains his memory and returns to his original female form.

In the Escaflowne movie, with his origins changed, Dilandau is a human who was infused with Draconian blood.

Emperor Dornkirk

 is the leader of Zaibach believed to be two hundred Earth years old and a former Earth scientist named Isaac Dornkirk. Isaac learned that physical attraction between matter is caused by the force of gravity. He thus believed that everything in the universe, including fate and destiny, is caused by a force and everything is governed by a universal law. His theories and discoveries led him into the invention of machines that can predict and change the future. Isaac was transported into Gaea and later became Emperor Dornkirk after "saving" the rural people of Zaibach with his knowledge.

Dornkirk continually looks into the future with his Destiny Prognostication Engine in order to create an ideal future for Gaea by unlocking the secrets of Atlantis. Hitomi's visions of the future and Van's connection to Escaflowne continually interfere with his efforts, however. The future he seeks to create is the "zone of absolute fortune", in which everyone's wishes would come true. However, it is that very power that destroyed Atlantis.

Nearing the end of the series, Dornkirk had successfully constructed his device to generate the "zone of absolute fortune". It was activated upon his death at the hands of Folken, which was immediately followed by Folken's own demise, a consequence of the workings of the machine. Dornkirk, kept alive by various machinery in the first place, sticks around as an incorporeal ghost to see how his experiment would turn out. Upon the deactivation of his machine, he finally vanishes.

Frequently hinted though never confirmed in the series, the character of Dornkirk was based on (and may very well actually be) the historical figure Sir Isaac Newton. Series writer and director Shoji Kawamori noted that Newton studied alchemy, even writing a book on it, so he theorized Newton discovering the power of Atlantis.

Supporting characters

Millerna Aston

Millerna Aston, the third princess of the kingdom of Asturia who is in love with Allen Schezar, though she is betrothed to the merchant prince Dryden Fassa. Millerna's ambition was once to become a doctor, but was forced to give up her medical studies by her second sister, Eries.

Her eldest sister, Marlene, is deceased, and was the wife of Duke Freid and the mother of Allen's son, Chid. Millerna later runs away from Asturia to join Van's troupe and fulfill her dreams. She is upset by her arranged engagement to Dryden, but gradually comes to appreciate her fiancé's good qualities. At the end of the series, however, they separate on good terms, with Dryden saying "I will come back when I'm more deserving of you." Millerna then realizes that she can't depend on others to make her happy.
When she was first introduced at the beginning of the series, it was seen that she wasn't fond of Hitomi, but later in the series she accepts her as a friend. Through she never finished medical school, she was a great help to Hitomi and the others when she saved Allen from near death and helped save Hitomi from a mental death.

Balgus Ganesha

 is one of the "three master swordsmen of Gaea" and a general of Fanelia's army. An enormous man of great strength, he is capable of fighting and dismembering guymelefs (mecha) without piloting a guymelef himself. Balgus served under Van's father in his younger days and later left to travel around Gaea, searching to improve his skills. He met Allen and trained him for a time, but when Van's father died he returned to Fanelia to look after Van and his mother. When Zaibach destroyed Fanelia, he died while saving Van.

Though he perished early in the series he continues to affect the lives of the main characters through his lasting influence as both a mentor to Van and teacher to Allen.

Merle

 is a thirteen-year-old catgirl and childhood friend of Van. She is jealous of Van's increasingly close relationship with Hitomi, but eventually comes to accept Hitomi and becomes a loyal friend to her.  As Van becomes conflicted in his relationship with Hitomi, Merle reveals to him that he loves Hitomi and that Merle had recognized it long before he did. She encourages Van to go find Hitomi after Hitomi unexpectedly returns to the Mystic Moon, and assures Van that his feelings will reach Hitomi.

An orphan, she has since devotedly followed Van since she was picked up by the Fanelian courts. She never hesitates to protect Van at all costs - Merle risks her life to save Van by hauling herself in front of twins Eriya and Naria, who spare Van when they see their past selves reflected in Merle.

Eriya and Naria

 are two eighteen-year-old leopard-girl sisters who serve Folken. Eriya has dark skin and gold hair, and Naria has light skin and silver hair. When still children, their parents were killed by humans due to prejudice against their race. To avoid being captured and sold into slavery, they tried to commit suicide. The sisters were saved by Folken and throughout their time spent with him, the two fell deeply in love with the young prince. Just like Jajuka to Dilandau, the two serve Zaibach only out of their loyalty to Folken, and not through truly believing in the motives of the empire.  They would do anything to protect Folken and are extremely overprotective of him. The both of them pilot different Guymelefs, called Teirings: Eriya pilots the Gold Teiring, and Naria pilots the Silver Teiring. Both of them die after an experiment with their blood goes wrong, causing them both to age at a rapid rate before dying in Folken's arms.

Jajuka

 is a dog-like beast-man. He becomes the only soldier under Dilandau's command after the dragon slayers are killed in battle by Van. A former-servant of the Sorcerers who kidnapped Celena, he was responsible for her well-being as a child and genuinely cared for her; the two were almost inseparable. When Dilandau was returned to the Sorcerers years later, Jajuka volunteered to fight beside him.

Eries Aston

Eries Aston is the second princess of Asturia and Millerna's older sister. Because she refuses to marry, she is ineligible for the throne. As such, the husband of her younger sister will inherit the throne of Asturia. She disapproves of Millerna's decision to be a doctor and attempts to discourage her younger sister from pursuing both the study of medicine and Allen Schezar. She also agrees to look after Allen's sister, Celena, when she mysteriously appears again, though it is soon discovered that Celena is actually Dilandau.

Dryden Fassa

Dryden Fassa is a knowledgeable, successful, and generous merchant who is also a part-time scholar. He is engaged to Millerna through his father Meiden, a friend of Asturia's king, though he is well aware that Millerna is in love with Allen Schezar. He genuinely cares for Millerna, and claims that his altruistic actions (such as paying an immense repair fee for Escaflowne) are to get her attention. Though the two are married later in the series, Dryden separates from Millerna and returns the ring, claiming that he isn't worthy of her yet. When she warns that she might not wait for him, he expresses confidence that his great love for her will eventually be returned.

Mole Man

The Mole Man is a mysterious petty thief who wanders around the forest near Fanelia. However, he gains the trust of his companions and follows Allen's crew aboard the Crusade.

After Hitomi and Van are transported by a pillar of light to the woods bordering Fanelia and Asturia, Mole Man tries to steal Hitomi's pendant, but is thwarted by Allen's arrival.  He later abets Van's unsuccessful attempt to escape from Fort Castelo and provides medicine for Hitomi and Merle's fevers.

Mole Man later accompanies Princess Millerna when she leaves Asturia to pursue Allen to the Duchy of Freid.  When Allen is injured, Mole Man encourages Millerna to use her medical knowledge to save Allen.  The Mole Man reappears shortly before Millerna's wedding. He shows her the necklace she was looking for, and observes that she used to "have a glow" about her, but it's now gone.

When Hitomi accompanies Van to Fanelia to confront Folken, the Mole Man appears from underneath Millerna's carriage to tell Gaddes, Allen, and the others that he saw them escaping to Fanelia.  At the end of the series, he's seen bidding farewell to Hitomi as she returns to Earth.

In the film, the Mole Man is a prophet who travels with the Abaharaki. He is paid by Allen and foretells that Hitomi is the Wing Goddess. He also helps craft Hitomi's pendant.

Prince Chid

Prince Chid, pronounced "Sheed", is the heir to duchy of Freid and is supposedly the Duke of Freid and Princess Marlene's son, but his real father is Allen Schezar. After Duke of Freid died, Chid eventually became the Duke.

When Princess Marlene had married Duke Freid, she never openly revealed the truth behind her pregnancy, but she wrote about it in a hidden diary that was later found by Millerna. Chid displays a strong connection and trust for Allen, though unaware of their true connection as father and son, and admires and hopes to live up to Duke Freid, the only father Chid has ever known. Though the Duke is apparently strict towards Chid, he recognizes Chid as his own son and cares for him deeply.

Yukari Uchida

Yukari Uchida is Hitomi's best friend and the manager of the track team.  When she learns that Amano is going to study abroad, Yukari encourages Hitomi to confess her feelins to Amano.  She witnesses Van's arrival on Earth and Hitomi being swept into a pillar of light to Gaea.

After Hitomi's disappearance, Yukari and Amano learn from Hitomi's mother that Hitomi's grandmother once also was taken by a pillar of light as girl but returned.  When Hitomi briefly returns to Earth about 24 hours before she disappeared, she relives events where she realizes that Yukari is in love with Amano.  However, Yukari kept her feelings to herself and supported Hitomi, leading Hitomi to cryptically apologize before reliving her sprint for Amano, knowing that Van will appear again to take her to Gaea.

At the end of the series, it's revealed that Yukari and Amano become a couple.

Susumu Amano

Susumu Amano (referred to by his surname Amano) is the captain of the Kamakura-Kita High School track club and Hitomi Kanzaki's crush.  When Hitomi learns he is moving aboard, she asks him to give her first kiss if she sprint 100 m in 13 seconds. Hitomi's attempt is interrupted by the sudden appearance of Van and a dragon, ending with Hitomi being swept up in a pillar of light to Gaea and Amano being unable to grab onto before she is taken.  On Gaea, Hitomi meets Allen Schezar, who bears an uncanny resemblance to Amano.

Following Hitomi's disappearance, Amano tries to contact her through her pager.  He and Yukari also learn from Hitomi's mother that Hitomi's grandmother had also once been taken away by a pillar of light during a summer festival and returned with the pendulum pendant she later gave Hitomi.

In the final episode, two girls are overheard discussing that Amano and Yukari are dating and make the "perfect couple."

See also
 List of The Vision of Escaflowne episodes

References

The Vision of Escaflowne
Vision of Escaflowne, The